Danny Flynn (born in Scunthorpe, Lincolnshire) is an English fantasy and science fiction artist. Flynn attended Saint Augustine Webster Primary School and High Ridge Comprehensive in his birth town Scunthorpe before taking a degree in Illustration at Kingston University.

Since the mid-1980s, Flynn has illustrated and designed novel covers, including for well-known authors, such as  Frederik Pohl, Greg Bear, Isaac Asimov, Robert A. Heinlein and Arthur C. Clarke. He also worked for game companies Electronic Arts and Traveller's Tales.

Flynn worked on a solo fantasy project for children - creating hundreds of quirky and colourful creatures who live inside the Moon. To date, there are over 200 characters.

In 2016, Flynn was noted in an article on CNN as a space artist who paints science fiction landscapes.

Namesakes
The British designer and screenprint/letterpress printer, Danny Flynn (printer), also working in the contemporary creative and commercial design fields.

See also
List of space artists

References

External links
 
 

Living people
English fantasy writers
English science fiction writers
Fantasy artists
People from Scunthorpe
Science fiction artists
British speculative fiction artists
Year of birth missing (living people)